Soy Yo may refer to:

Music
"Soy Yo" (Bomba Estéreo song), 2015
Soy Yo (Los Yonic's album), 1976
Soy Yo (Marta Sánchez album), 2002
"Soy Yo" (Marta Sánchez song), 2002
Soy Yo (Kany García album), 2018
"Soy Yo" (Don Omar song), 2022

See also
Yo Soy (disambiguation)